Third Creek Township is an inactive township in Gasconade County, in the U.S. state of Missouri.

Third Creek Township was established in 1841, and named after Third Creek.

References

Townships in Missouri
Townships in Gasconade County, Missouri